Saint Augustine or Augustine of Hippo (354–430) was a bishop, theologian and father of the Latin Catholic Church. 

Saint Augustine may also refer to:

People
 Augustine of Canterbury (d. 604), first Archbishop of Canterbury
 Augustine Webster, English Catholic martyr
 Eysteinn Erlendsson (d. 1188), Archbishop of Nidaros, latinized as Augustinus Nidrosiensis

Places
Saint Augustine, Trinidad and Tobago
St. Augustine, Ontario, Canada
St Augustine's (UK Parliament constituency), Kent, England
Lathe of St. Augustine, an historical division of Kent
St. Augustine, Florida, United States
St. Augustine, Illinois, United States
St. Augustine, Maryland, United States
Saint Augustin, Madagascar

Schools
St. Augustine's College (Ghana)
St Augustine's Day School, Kolkata, India
St. Augustine's Day School, Shyamnagar, West Bengal, India
St. Augustines School (Vasai), India
St. Augustine's School, Kalimpong, Philippines
Saint Augustine School, Tanza, Philippines
St. Augustine Girls' High School, St. Augustine, Trinidad and Tobago
St Augustine of Canterbury Catholic Primary School (Gillingham, Kent), England
St. Augustine's Catholic School (Culver City, California)
Saint Augustine School (Laredo, Texas), United States

Music
"St. Augustine", a song by moe.
"St. Augustine", a song by Band of Horses

Other uses
USS St. Augustine (PG-54), a United States Navy gunboat during World War II
St. Augustine grass
St Augustine's Hospital, Chartham, Kent, England (closed 1993)
St Augustine's Tower, Hackney, London, England
Chair of St Augustine in Canterbury Cathedral, Kent, England

See also
Augustinus (disambiguation)
Augustine (disambiguation)
Cathedral of Saint Augustine (disambiguation)
Enchiridion of Augustine
"I Dreamed I Saw St. Augustine", a song by Bob Dylan
Order of Saint Augustine, Catholic religious order
Presidio San Augustin del Tucson
Saint-Augustin (disambiguation)
St. Augustine Catholic Church (disambiguation)
St. Augustine Catholic Church and Cemetery (disambiguation)
St Augustine of Canterbury School (disambiguation)
St. Augustine Catholic High School (disambiguation)
St. Augustine High School (disambiguation)
St. Augustine's (disambiguation)
St Augustine's Abbey (disambiguation)
St. Augustine's Church (disambiguation)
St. Augustine's College (disambiguation)
St Augustine's Priory, Ealing
St. Augustine's Seminary
San Augustin Mountains
San Augustine, Texas
San Augustine County, Texas
Sankt Augustin
Siege of St. Augustine (1702)
Siege of St. Augustine (1740)
San Agustín